Zilo is a rural locality (a selo) in Botlikhsky District, Republic of Dagestan, Russia. The population was 1,215 as of 2010. There are 8 streets.

Geography 
Zilo is located 32 km southeast of Botlikh (the district's administrative centre) by road, on the left bank of the Unsatlen River. Kizhani is the nearest rural locality.

References 

Rural localities in Botlikhsky District